Adie is both a surname and a given name of Scottish origin, a medieval pet form of Adam. Notable people with the name include:

Surname:
 Alexander Adie (1775–1859), Scottish inventor
 George Adie (1901–1989), English stock-broker
 Kate Adie (born 1945), British journalist
 Lilias Adie, Scottish prisoner
 Norman Adie (born 1946), film exhibitor and Ponzi schemer
 William John Adie (1886–1935), British neurologist

Given name:
 Adie Allen (born 1966), British actress
 Adie Mike (born 1973), English football forward
 Adie Moses (born 1975), English footballer
 Adie Arsham Salleh (born 1988), Bruneian footballer
 Adie Smith (born 1973), English footballer

Fictional characters:
 Adie, The Sword of Truth, a fictional character in the epic fantasy series The Sword of Truth

See also 
 Adrienne Camp (born 1981), singer and songwriter
 Adie Inlet
 Adie syndrome

References 

English given names